The Great Seal of the State of Montana was adopted in 1865, when Montana was a United States Territory. When it became a state in 1889, it was decided to use the same seal. In 1891, proposals were made to make changes or adopt a brand new seal. None of these proposals passed legislation. The outer ring of the seal contains the text "The Great Seal of the State of Montana". The inner circle depicts a landscape of mountains, plains and forests by the Great Falls on the Missouri River. A plow, a pick and a shovel are depicted on the front, representing the state's industry. The banner at the bottom of the seal reads the territorial motto of Oro y Plata, meaning "Gold and Silver" in Spanish. Montana also has many popular unofficial mottos including "The last best Place" and "Big Sky Country"

External links
Symbols of Montana

References

Symbols of Montana
Montana
Montana
Montana
Montana
Montana
Montana
Montana